Record Retailer was the only music trade newspaper for the UK record industry. It was founded in August 1959 as a monthly newspaper covering both labels and dealers. Its founding editor was Roy Parker (who died on 27 December 1964). The title changed to Record Retailer and Music Industry News shortly after launch.

With its issue of 10 March 1960, Record Retailer became a weekly magazine and started a chart showing the top 50 records in sales. For the period until February 1969, when a standardised UK chart was established with the British Market Research Bureau, the Official Charts Company recognises the listings compiled by Record Retailer as representing the official national chart.

On 5 October 1967 the title reverted to Record Retailer and in January 1971 became Record & Tape Retailer. The publication was relaunched on 18 March 1972 as Music Week.

References

See also
UK Singles Chart

1959 establishments in the United Kingdom
1971 disestablishments in the United Kingdom
Professional and trade magazines
Music magazines published in the United Kingdom
Newspapers established in 1959
Defunct weekly newspapers
Defunct newspapers published in the United Kingdom
Defunct magazines published in the United Kingdom
Magazines disestablished in 1971
British record charts